Barbra Live was the sixth concert tour by American recording artist Barbra Streisand. Visiting North American and European markets, the tour was Streisand's first tour since 2006. 
Barbra Live was the 22nd best-selling tour in the world during 2012. It earned $40.7 million and sold 154,287 tickets.

In April 2013 it was officially announced that Streisand would continue the tour through Europe in the summer of 2013.

The shows at Brooklyn's Barclays Center were filmed and released on CD and DVD as Back to Brooklyn.

Background 
Initially planned as two shows to mark the opening of the new Barclays Center in Brooklyn, the show was billed as Barbra's Homecoming, since Streisand was born in Brooklyn. The shows sold out quickly and no further dates were added. On August 9, 2012 it was announced that Streisand would expand the series of concerts, opening in Philadelphia on October 8, 2012. On September 14, three additional engagements in America were added. One of these dates included the Hollywood Bowl, where Streisand's 1967 performance, An Evening with Barbra Streisand, broke the Bowl's attendance record at the time with an audience of 17,256 people.

Reception

Critical 
The concerts received mostly positive reviews and critical acclaim. The Ottawa Sun reviewed the concert at Scotiabank Place and wrote "Streisand's voice was truly exceptional. Intimate, yet on a grand scale, only she could do a concert that was small enough to feel personal, yet big enough to feel like a Broadway musical." Miriam Di Nunzio from the Chicago Sun-Times wrote "At 70, the singer still possesses one of the most pristine voices in music, a voice that completely and sumptuously envelops a room, even one the size of the cavernous United Center. There is an intimacy and honesty in Streisand's deliverya rare treat in this age of lip-synched, overblown concert extravaganzas." The Jerusalem Post wrote on her opening night in Philadelphia, "Her voice (and cleavage) were better than many of the stars half her age that are currently touring."  The Vancouver Sun stated that "The perennially decorated singer/actor/writer/director left an indelible mark on her Vancouver audience with a performance that was pure, undiluted class."

The show also garnered some negative reviews. The Oakland Tribune reviewed the San Jose concert at HP Pavilion and stated that Streisand relied too much on guest stars and wasted stage time with other performers. Jim Harrington wrote that the show "left too little time for what really should've been the focus of the nightStreisand's voice... I indeed look forward to seeing Streisand 'Some Other Time' and when it happens, hopefully she'll leave some of her friends and family members behind."

Commercial 
The first shows at Brooklyn's Barclays Center sold out within a day of going on sale. After the show at the Hollywood Bowl sold out, an additional date was added.  A second London show at The O2 Arena was added following the demand for the first show, which sold out quickly.
A show in Paris was already on sale, but it was canceled to make time for a second show in Amsterdam.

Set list 
This set list is representative of the official DVD track listing. It does not represent all concerts for the duration of the tour.

"As If We’ve Never Said Goodbye"
"Nice 'n' Easy" / "That Face"
"The Way He Makes Me Feel"
"Bewitched, Bothered, and Bewildered" 
"Didn’t We"
"Smile" 
"Sam, You Made the Pants Too Long"       
"No More Tears (Enough Is Enough)"
"The Way We Were" / "Through the Eyes of Love"
"Being Good Is Good Enough"
"Rose’s Turn" / "Some People" / "Don't Rain on My Parade"
"You're the Top"
"What'll I Do" / "My Funny Valentine"
"Lost Inside of You" 
"Evergreen (Love Theme from A Star Is Born)" 
"Nature Boy" 
"How Deep Is the Ocean?" 
"People"
"Here’s to Life"
"Make Our Garden Grow" / "Somewhere" 
"Some Other Time"
"Happy Days Are Here Again"

Shows

References

Barbra Streisand concert tours
2012 concert tours
2013 concert tours
Concert tours of North America
Concert tours of Europe